Arum apulum, known as Apulian arum, is a flowering plant species in the family Araceae.

Description
Arum apulum is a tuberous herbs that spreads clonally through discoid vertically oriented tubers. Flowers are borne on a spadix.

Habitat
The species is endemic to Italy, where it grows in low scrub at altitudes of 300 to 400 meters in central Apulia. It is threatened by habitat destruction.

Taxonomy
Within the genus Arum, it belongs to subgenus Arum, section Dioscoridea, and subsection Dischroochiton.

A. apulum is tetraploid, with a chromosome count of 2n = 56.

References

External links

Garden plants of Europe
Flora of Italy
apulum